San Chirico Nuovo is an Arbëreshë town and comune in the province of Potenza, in the southern Italian region of Basilicata. It was founded  by Albanian settlerswith the blessing of the prince of Tolve.

References

Cities and towns in Basilicata
Arbëresh settlements